Karl Mueller (July 27, 1963 – June 17, 2005) was an American rock musician. He was the bass guitarist and a founding member of the Minneapolis alternative rock band Soul Asylum.

In May 2004, Mueller, a longtime smoker, was diagnosed with esophageal cancer, and a benefit concert was held to help him with his medical bills. In September of that year, Grant Hart and Bob Mould of Hüsker Dü reunited for the first time in seventeen years at the Rock for Karl benefit in Minneapolis. Paul Westerberg also made an appearance, as did Soul Asylum, in Mueller's last public performance. Mueller died of cancer in June 2005. Mueller was subsequently cremated and his remains reside at Lakewood Cemetery in Minneapolis. His widow, Mary Beth, resides in Minneapolis.

As of 2020, Mueller is still credited as a member on their Facebook page as a tribute.

Posthumous
In July 2006, Soul Asylum released The Silver Lining, a studio album featuring Mueller's last work.

Mueller was also pictured on the cover of the EP Clam Dip & Other Delights, released on April 14, 1989.

References

External links
 The Soul Asylum  Band records are available for research use at the Minnesota Historical Society.

1963 births
2005 deaths
American rock bass guitarists
American male bass guitarists
Grunge musicians
Musicians from Minneapolis
Deaths from esophageal cancer
Deaths from cancer in Minnesota
Burials at Lakewood Cemetery
20th-century American bass guitarists
Guitarists from Minnesota
Soul Asylum members
20th-century American male musicians